Duleh (also Romanized as Dūleh) is a village in Alan Rural District, in the Central District of Sardasht County, West Azerbaijan Province, Iran. At the 2006 census, its population was 76, in 17 families.

References 

Populated places in Sardasht County